The National Resource Directory (NRD) is a United States Government inter-agency web portal for Wounded Warriors, Service Members, Veterans, their families and caregivers. It provides information and links to thousand of national, state and local resources.  The NRD was established to support the reintegration, recovery and rehabilitation of our members of the United States Armed Forces. According to Assistant Secretary of Labor for Disability Employment Policy, Kathleen Martinez, "the National Resource Directory is part of our commitment to ensuring they have access to the resources they need to recover and successfully return to work and civilian life."
 
Visitors to the web portal can find information about Veterans' benefits, including disability and pension benefits, VA health care and educational opportunities, homeless assistance and employment resources. The site also provides information for those who care for Veterans, such as access to emotional, financial and community assistance.

The links include federal, state and local government agencies, Veterans service organizations, non-profit and community-based organizations, and academic institutions and professional associations. 
	
The National Resource Directory is a collaborative effort between the U.S. Department of Defense, U.S. Department of Labor and U.S. Department of Veterans Affairs.

References 

 Army Times. "Online Directory Spreading Links to Benefits Resources" (November 29, 2010) 
 The Disability Law & Policy e-Newsletter. "New Organizations and Resources" (November 12, 2010) 
 Military Advanced Education News. "Warrior Proponent: Advancing Servicemember Care and Transition Support" (December 10, 2010) 
 Military Avenue Newsletter. "Collaboration is Key to Family Support Effort, Official Says" (January 26, 2011) 
 MSNBC. "Warrior Gateway Helps Digital-Age Vets" (May 23, 2010)

External links
 

Government services web portals in the United States